Aka-Jahan Dastagir (born 15 June 1946 in Kabul) is a retired Afghanistan wrestler, who competed at the 1968 Summer Olympic Games in the lightweight freestyle event.

References

Wrestlers at the 1968 Summer Olympics
Afghan male sport wrestlers
Olympic wrestlers of Afghanistan
Sportspeople from Kabul
1946 births
Living people
Wrestlers at the 1966 Asian Games
Wrestlers at the 1974 Asian Games
Asian Games competitors for Afghanistan